Leandro de Oliveira Noronha (born April 22, 1985), commonly known as Leandro Cearense, is a Brazilian footballer. He currently plays for Villa Nova.

Honours

Club
Remo
Campeonato Paraense: 2014

Paysandu
Campeonato Paraense: 2016, 2017
Copa Verde: 2016

References

External links
 Leandro Cearense at playmakerstats.com (English version of ogol.com.br)
 

1985 births
Living people
Brazilian footballers
Brazilian expatriate footballers
Vila Nova Futebol Clube players
Cuiabá Esporte Clube players
Clube do Remo players
Nacional Futebol Clube players
Paysandu Sport Club players
Fortaleza Esporte Clube players
Esporte Clube Água Santa players
ABC Futebol Clube players
Oman Club players
Esporte Clube Novo Hamburgo players
Villa Nova Atlético Clube players
Campeonato Brasileiro Série B players
Campeonato Brasileiro Série C players
Campeonato Brasileiro Série D players
Campeonato Paranaense players
Association football forwards
Brazilian expatriate sportspeople in Oman
Expatriate footballers in Oman
Sportspeople from Pará
People from Castanhal